William Kipchirchir Samoei Arap Ruto  (born 21 December 1966) is a Kenyan politician who is serving as the fifth and current and most cowardly president of Kenya since 13 September 2022. Prior to becoming president, he served as the first deputy president of Kenya from 2013 to 2022. Previously, holders of the position were referred to as Vice President.  He previously served in several cabinet portfolio such as the Minister for Home Affairs, the Minister of Agriculture and as Minister for Higher Education.

Ruto was elected Member of Parliament for Eldoret North constituency from 1997 to 2007, under the KANU and 2007 to 2013 through ODM party. He was the Minister for Home Affairs in the Daniel arap Moi administration from August to December 2002. Under the Mwai Kibaki administration, he was the Minister for Agriculture from 2008 to 2010 and Minister for Higher Education from April to October 2010. Ruto ran for the deputy presidency in the 2013 election under the United Republican Party, becoming the running mate of Uhuru Kenyatta from The National Alliance (TNA). He was re-elected to the deputy presidency under the Jubilee Party in the 2017 Kenyan general election. Ruto successfully ran for the presidency in the 2022 election, this time under the United Democratic Alliance (UDA). Amidst a fall out, Kenyatta supported his opponent Raila Odinga. The election was marred by allegations of electoral fraud by allies of Odinga, although international observers have not corroborated such claims.

Early life and education 

A member of the Kalenjin people of the Rift Valley Province, William Ruto was born on 21 December 1966 in Sambut village, Kamagut,
 Uasin Gishu County, to Daniel Cheruiyot and Sarah Cheruiyot.

Education                       
                                                      

Ruto first studied at Kamagut Primary School, then transferred to Kerotet Primary School within Uasin Gishu County, where he sat for his Certificate of Primary Education (CPE). He then proceeded to Wareng Secondary School still in Uasin Gishu County and Kapsabet High School in Nandi County, where he obtained his Ordinary Level and Advanced Level education respectively.

He then enrolled at the University of Nairobi to study botany and zoology, graduating in 1990 with a bachelor of science in both fields. He went on to complete a masters program in plant ecology also from the University of Nairobi. The following year after his graduation, he enrolled for a Ph.D. at the University of Nairobi, after several setbacks, he completed and graduated on 21 December 2018 with a Ph.D. from the university.

Ruto authored several papers including a paper titled Plant Species Diversity and Composition of Two Wetland in the Nairobi National Park, Kenya. During his time in the campus for his undergraduate education, Ruto was an active member of the Christian Union. He also served as the Chairman of the University of Nairobi's choir.

Through his church activities at the University of Nairobi, he met President Daniel Arap Moi, who would later introduce him to politics during the 1992 general elections.

Political career

After graduating from the University of Nairobi in 1990, Ruto was employed as a teacher in the North Rift region of Kenya from 1990 to 1992, where he was also the leader of the local African Inland Church (AIC) Choir.

YK'92

Ruto began his political career when he became the treasurer of the YK'92 campaign group that was lobbying for the re-election of President Moi in 1992, from which he learned the basics of Kenyan politics. He is also believed to have accumulated some wealth in this period. After the 1992 elections, President Moi disbanded YK'92 and Ruto attempted to vie for various KANU (then Kenya's ruling party) branch party positions but did not succeed.

Member of Parliament

Ruto ran for a parliamentary seat in the 1997 general election. He surprisingly beat the incumbent, Reuben Chesire, Moi's preferred candidate, as well as the Uasin Gishu KANU branch chairman and assistant minister. After this, he would later gain favour with Moi and be appointed KANU Director of Elections. His strong support in 2002 for Moi's preferred successor Uhuru Kenyatta saw him get a place as assistant minister in the Home Affairs (Interior) ministry docket. Later in that election, as some government ministers resigned to join the opposition, he would be promoted to be the full Cabinet Minister in the ministry. KANU lost the election but he retained his parliamentary seat. Ruto would thereafter be elected KANU Secretary General in 2005 with Uhuru Kenyatta getting elected as chairman.

In 2005, Kenya held a constitutional referendum which KANU opposed. Some members of the ruling NARC coalition government, mainly former KANU ministers who had joined the opposition coalition in 2002 under the LDP banner and who were disgruntled as the President Kibaki had not honored a pre-election MoU on power-sharing and creation of a Prime Minister post, joined KANU to oppose the proposed constitution. Since the symbol of the "No" vote was an Orange, this new grouping named their movement the Orange Democratic Movement (ODM). Ruto was part of its top brass, dubbed the Pentagon. He solidified his voter base in the Rift Valley Province. ODM was victorious in the referendum.

In January 2006, Ruto declared publicly that he would vie for the presidency in the next general election (2007). His statement was condemned by some of his KANU colleagues, including former president Moi. By this time, ODM had morphed into a political party. Ruto sought the nomination of the Orange Democratic Movement (ODM) as its presidential candidate, but on 1 September 2007, he placed third with 368 votes. The winner was Raila Odinga with 2,656 votes and the runner-up was Musalia Mudavadi with 391. Ruto expressed his support for Odinga after the vote. As KANU under Uhuru Kenyatta moved to support Kibaki, he resigned from his post as KANU secretary general on 6 October 2007.

The presidential election of December 2007 ended in an impasse. Kenya's electoral commission declared Kibaki the winner, but Raila and ODM claimed the victory. Mwai Kibaki was hurriedly sworn in as the president of the December 2007 presidential election. Following the election and the dispute over the result, Kenya was engulfed by a violent political crisis. Kibaki and Odinga agreed to form a power-sharing government. In the grand coalition Cabinet named on 13 April 2008 and sworn in on 17 April, Ruto was appointed as Minister for Agriculture. Ruto also became the Eldoret North's Member of Parliament from 2008 to 4 March 2013.

Ruto was among the list of people who were indicted to stand trial at the ICC for their involvement in Kenya's 2007/2008 political violence. However, the ICC case was faced with challenges, especially concerning the withdrawal of key prosecution witnesses. In April 2016, the Court dropped charges against Ruto.

On 21 April 2010, Ruto was transferred from the Agriculture Ministry and posted to the Higher Education Ministry, swapping posts with Sally Kosgei. On 24 August 2011, Ruto was relieved of his ministerial duties and remained a member of parliament. He joined with Uhuru Kenyatta to form the Jubilee alliance for the 2013 presidential election.

Deputy Presidency

Acting President

On 6 October 2014, Ruto was appointed acting president of Kenya by the then President Uhuru Kenyatta following his summons to appear before the ICC. He served in the role between 6 and 9 October 2014 while President Kenyatta was away at The Hague. When he officially handed over power to Ruto at the Parliament on October 6, Uhuru explained, "To protect the sovereignty of the Republic of Kenya, I will sign a legal notice appointing Hon William Ruto as acting president while I attend the status conference."

In the August 2017 General Elections, Uhuru and Ruto were declared victors after garnering 54% of the total votes cast. However, the Supreme Court of Kenya nullified the election, and a fresh election was held in October 2017. The opposition boycotted the fresh election and Uhuru and Ruto were re-elected with 98% of the total votes cast. The Supreme Court upheld the results of this second election.

Presidential campaign

In December 2020 Ruto announced his alliance with the newly formed United Democratic Alliance party. He was the only presidential candidate to attend the second part of the 2022 presidential debate.

On 15 August 2022, six days after the general election held on 9 August, the Independent Electoral and Boundaries Commission chair Wafula Chebukati announced that Ruto had won the presidential election, defeating candidate Raila Odinga of the Azimio La Umoja party. Ruto received 50.49% of the valid votes cast, while Odinga received 48.85%.

Odinga disputed the presidential election results announced by the Independent Electoral and Boundaries Commission, and he challenged the results with the Supreme Court. On 5 September, the Supreme Court judges unanimously found that Odinga's alliance had presented inconclusive evidence of its claims that the election was rigged, and it upheld the election of Ruto as the president-elect. In response to the ruling, Odinga said he respected the Supreme Court's decision even though he strongly disagreed with it.

Presidency

On 13 September 2022 he was inaugurated at Moi International Sports Centre, Kasarani in a ceremony presided over by Chief Justice Martha Koome, and attended by over 20 heads of state and government. The inauguration day was declared a public holiday. Attendance was very high, with groups of the general public clashing with security officials, when trying to enter the stadium, the event however continued peacefully. Following his inauguration he officially began his term as President of Kenya.

After taking office Ruto announced a pledge to address climate change and end the use of fossil fuels in Kenya's electricity production by 2030.

President Ruto made his maiden foreign trip to the United Kingdom as head of state on 18 September 2022 during which he attended the late Queen Elizabeth II state funeral
 service on 19 September 2022 at the Westminster Abbey in London.

President Ruto made his debut address to the United Nations General Assembly (UNGA) as a head of state on 21 September 2022, days after arriving in New York from London where he had attended the state funeral of the late Queen Elizabeth II. He nodded to President Biden’s “Build Back Better” domestic plan, proposing a global effort toward “building back better from the bottom upward.” The goal, he said, should be “including the marginalized, working majority in the economic mainstream.” Other themes he addressed were; the expansion of the representation of Africa on the U.N. Security Council, increased investment in Africa continent, “moving Africa from aid to investment”, tapping “the ever-bustling” human capital for economic prosperity and a concerted effort towards tackling climate change in the world.

In September 2022, he said that the Horn of Africa is experiencing its worst drought in 40 years, adding that "3.1 million people are facing severe drought" in Kenya alone.

Asked about the ongoing Tigray War in northern Ethiopia between government forces and Tigray rebels, Ruto said that "whatever happens in Ethiopia gets to Kenya".

Speaking about the Somali Civil War, he said that “Kenyan troops will come back home as soon as we're done with the assignment that we have in Somalia.”

In November 2022 Ruto's government launched the Hustler Fund, a loan program to grant immediate loans to Kenyan citizens.

It decides to launch a large-scale programme of privatisation of public enterprises.

Controversies

Land grabbing

Weston Hotel land

Ruto has been involved in a land grabbing saga involving his mysterious acquisition of Weston Hotel land, pitted against public counteraccusations with several state corporations in Kenya, all surrounding the original owner of the land. According to The Standard, the Kenya Civil Aviation Authority (KCAA), a state agency, was duped into surrendering the land on which the Weston Hotel was built. In 2001, KCAA, which originally occupied the land, was given alternative pieces of land belonging to another state agency, the meteorological department. KCAA did not occupy the alternative piece of land upon which Ruto's Weston Hotel was built. According to KCAA, a powerful cartel, working in the lands ministry was involved in a conspiracy to relinquish the same piece of land with several land ministry officers also involved in the conspiracy. In January 2019, it emerged that according to another state agency, the National Lands Commission, Ruto owed and needed to pay the people of Kenya for the land 0.773 acres opposite Wilson Airport upon which the Weston Hotel was built. In February 2019, Ruto publicly admitted the Weston Hotel land had been acquired illegally by the original owners who sold him the land, and that he had no knowledge of the matter.
In August 2020, Ruto offered to pay the state agency for the land. Later in 2020, KCAA was refused to be compensated for the land and so, demanded demolition of the hotel because of acquisition through illegality, fraud and corruption.
According to the KCAA, the public land was designated for the construction of headquarters and flight paths, and it had been disposed of the land by collusion with private entities, Priority Ltd and Monene Investments both reported to be associated with Ruto. Later in the same month, another legislator, Ngunjiri Wambugu, demanded all other cases in Kenya involving stolen property be thrown out as long as suspects were willing to compensate for it, in an effort to complain about the preferential treatment Ruto was receiving for his involvement in the state's stolen property. In December 2020, the KCB Bank backed Ruto in the court battle to repossess the land, fearing the loss of security against the advancement of 1.2 billion shillings  in Weston hotel associated with Ruto.

KPC Ngong Forest Land Scandal

In 2004, Ruto was charged with defrauding another state corporation Kenya Pipeline Company (KPC) of huge amounts of money through dubious land deals. He was acquitted in 2011 but in 2020, as his relationship with President Uhuru Kenyatta seemed to falter amid the President's push for an anti-corruption war, the police re-opened investigations in the case.

Muteshi Land 

In June 2013, Ruto was ordered by a court to pay a victim of 2007/08 post-election violence 5 million shillings for illegally taking away his land during the post-election violence. In the same judgement, Ruto was evicted from the grabbed land in Uasin Gishu. Adrian Muteshi had accused Ruto of grabbing and trespassing on his 100-acre piece of land in Uasin Gishu after he, Adrian, had fled his land for safety during the post-election violence of 2007/08. In February 2014, Ruto appealed the court order to pay the 5 million shilling fine. In 2017, Ruto withdrew the appeal against the judgment. In October 2020, Adrian Muteshi died of an unspecified cause at the age of 86.

Joseph Murumbi's 900-Acres 

In October 2019, the Daily Nation reported that Ruto's acquisition of a 900-acre piece of land of another former vice president Joseph Murumbi haunted Ruto because he had been involved in the irregular acquisition of the land. In the same month, Ruto claimed that the articles were persistent, and obviously sponsored fake news. Later, still in the same month, a human rights lobby activist, Trusted Society of Human Rights Alliance called for an investigation into the mysterious acquisition of a 900-acre piece of land that formerly belonged to another former vice-president Murumbi. According to the allegations, Murumbi had been involved in a loan dispute over loan defaults with a state corporation, AFC, against the land that was charged as a security for the loan. It is alleged that Murumbi defaulted the loan and AFC took over ownership of the land that was eventually sold to Ruto after he paid off the loan owed to the state corporation.

International Criminal Court summons

In December 2010, the prosecutor of the International Criminal Court announced that he was seeking the summons of six people, including Ruto, over their involvement in the 2007–8 electoral violence. The ICC's Pre-Trial Chamber subsequently issued a summons for Ruto at the prosecutor's request. Ruto was accused of planning and organizing crimes against supporters of President Kibaki's Party of National Unity. He was charged with three counts of crimes against humanity, one for murder, one for the forcible transfer of population, and one for persecution. On 23 January 2012, the ICC confirmed the charges against Ruto and Joshua Sang, in a case that also involved Uhuru Kenyatta, Francis Muthaura, Henry Kosgey and Major General Mohammed Hussein Ali. Ruto told the US government that the Kiambaa church fire on 1 January 2008 after the 2007 general election was merely accidental. The Waki Commission report stated in 2009 that "the incident which captured the attention of both Kenyans and the world was a deliberate burning of live people, mostly Kikuyu women, and children huddled together in a church" in Kiambaa on 1 January 2008. In April 2016, the prosecution of Ruto was abandoned by the International Criminal Court.

Home attack 

On 28 July 2017, Ruto's home was targeted by at least one attacker armed with a machete, and the police officer on duty guarding the residence was injured. During the time of the attack, he and his family were not at the compound as he had left hours earlier for a campaign rally in Kitale. There were reports of gunfire and several security sources said the attack was staged by multiple people. Police initially thought there were a few attackers because the attacker used different firearms. Around 48 hours later, Kenya Police chief Joseph Boinnet announced that the attacker was shot dead and the situation was under control.

Personal life 

Ruto is married to Rachel Chebet. The young couple first lived in Dagoretti where they had their first child. They were married in 1991 at the Africa Inland Church.

He is an evangelical Christian and a member of the Africa Inland Church.

He owns a considerable chicken farm in his home village of Sugoi, which was originally inspired by his stint as a chicken seller/hawker on the Nairobi-Eldoret-Malaba highway. Ruto and his wife build a chapel in their compound at their residence in the Karen suburb of Nairobi.

See also 

 Presidency of William Ruto
 List of heads of state of Kenya
 2022 Kenyan general election

References

External links

 BBC News, Kenya's political punch-up

 William Ruto, William Ruto – Profile and Biography
 Mboche Obute, Bottom up economic model

|-

|-

|-

|-

|-

|-

|-

|-

|-

1966 births
Jubilee Party politicians
Kalenjin people
Kenya African National Union politicians
Kenyan Christians
Living people
Members of the National Assembly (Kenya)
Ministers of Agriculture of Kenya
People from Rift Valley Province
People indicted by the International Criminal Court
United Republican Party (Kenya) politicians
University of Nairobi alumni
Presidents of Kenya
Vice-presidents of Kenya